Scappoose High School is a public high school in Scappoose, Oregon, United States. It is the only high school in the Scappoose School District.

Academics
In 2008, 95% of the school's seniors received their high school diploma. Of 168 students, 160 graduated, 5 dropped out, 1 received a modified diploma, and 2 are still in high school.

Notable alumni
Derek Anderson, American football player
CC Barber, Miss Oregon 2009
David Mayo, American football player
Sara Jean Underwood, 2007 Playboy Playmate of the Year

References

High schools in Columbia County, Oregon
Scappoose, Oregon
Public high schools in Oregon